André Dhôtel (1 September 1900 in Attigny, Ardennes – 22 July 1991 in Paris) was a French writer, novelist, storyteller, and poet. He is still very well known for his book Le Pays où l'on n'arrive jamais (1955), which won the Femina Prize in 1955.

References

External links 
 André Dhôtel son Internet Movie Database
 Association des amis d'André Dhôtel
 Le fonds André Dhôtel de la bibliothèque universitaire d'Angers
 Bibliography

People from Ardennes (department)
20th-century French novelists
French male screenwriters
20th-century French screenwriters
French male short story writers
French short story writers
1900 births
1991 deaths
Prix Sainte-Beuve winners
Prix Femina winners
20th-century French male writers
French male non-fiction writers
20th-century French essayists